Cook County Board of Commissioners 3rd district is a electoral district for the Cook County Board of Commissioners.

The district was established in 1994, when the board transitioned from holding elections in individual districts, as opposed to the previous practice of holding a set of two at-large elections (one for ten seats from the city of Chicago and another for seven seats from suburban Cook County).

Geography

1994 boundaries
When the district was first established, it covered parts of the South Side of Chicago and southwest suburbs of Cook County.

2001 redistricting
New boundaries were adopted in August 2001, with redistricting taking place following the 2000 United States Census.

In regards to townships and equivalent jurisdictions, the district's redistricted boundaries included portions of the city of Chicago, as well as portions of Worth Township.

2012 redistricting
The district currently, as redistricted in 2012 following the 2010 United States Census, lays entirely within the city of Chicago, including part of the central city and the South Side.

The district is 21.95 square miles (14,046.55 acres).

Politics
All commissioners representing this district, since its inception, have been Democrats. The district has voted strongly Democratic in its Cook County Board of Commissioners elections.

List of commissioners representing the district

Election results

|-
| colspan=16 style="text-align:center;" |Cook County Board of Commissioners 3rd district general elections
|-
!Year
!Winning candidate
!Party
!Vote (pct)
!Opponent
!Party
! Vote (pct)
|-
|1994
| |Jerry "Iceman" Butler 
| |Democratic
| | 
| | Clara Simms-Johnson
| | Republican
| | 
|-
|1998
| |Jerry "Iceman" Butler
| | Democratic
| |72,279 (91.25%)
| | Nathan Peoples
| | Republican
| | 6,928 (8.75%)
|-
|2002
| |Jerry "Iceman" Butler
| | Democratic
| |76,883 (100%)
|
|
|
|-
|2006
| |Jerry "Iceman" Butler
| | Democratic
| |73,932 (89.86%)
| | Marie J. "Jenny" Wohadlo
| | Republican
| | 8,340 (10.14%)
|-
|2010
| |Jerry "Iceman" Butler
| | Democratic
| |78,106 (88.84%)
| | Marie J. "Jenny" Wohadlo
| | Green
| | 9,809 (11.16%)
|-
|2014
| |Jerry "Iceman" Butler
| | Democratic
| |77,354 (100%)
| 
| 
| 
|-
|2018
| |Bill Lowry
| | Democratic
| |101,576 (89.57%)
| | George Blakemore
| | Republican
| | 11,834 (10.43%)
|-
|2022
| |Bill Lowry
| | Democratic
| |75,868 (100%)
|
|
|

References

Cook County Board of Commissioners districts
Constituencies established in 1994
1994 establishments in Illinois